Deloit is a city in Crawford County, Iowa, along the Boyer River. The population was 250 at the time of the 2020 census.

History
Deloit was platted in 1899. It was named after Beloit, Wisconsin, but the name was later altered.

Geography
Deloit is located at  (42.097204, -95.319168).

Demographics

2010 census
As of the census of 2010, there were 264 people, 109 households, and 71 families living in the city. The racial makeup of the city was 87.5% White, 11.0% from other races, and 1.5% from two or more races. Hispanic or Latino of any race were 22.0% of the population.

There were 109 households, of which 28.4% had children under the age of 18 living with them, 45.9% were married couples living together, 14.7% had a female householder with no husband present, 4.6% had a male householder with no wife present, and 34.9% were non-families. 26.6% of all households were made up of individuals, and 11% had someone living alone who was 65 years of age or older. The average household size was 2.42 and the average family size was 2.89.

The median age in the city was 36 years. 25.8% of residents were under the age of 18; 7.6% were between the ages of 18 and 24; 21.9% were from 25 to 44; 30.2% were from 45 to 64; and 14.4% were 65 years of age or older. The gender makeup of the city was 48.9% male and 51.1% female.

2000 census
As of the census of 2000, there were 288 people, 114 households, and 76 families living in the city. The racial makeup of the city was 93.40% White, 0.69% Native American, 2.78% from other races, and 3.12% from two or more races. Hispanic or Latino of any race were 4.17% of the population.

There were 114 households, out of which 30.7% had children under the age of 18 living with them, 50.0% were married couples living together, 10.5% had a female householder with no husband present, and 33.3% were non-families. 24.6% of all households were made up of individuals, and 10.5% had someone living alone who was 65 years of age or older. The average household size was 2.53 and the average family size was 2.95.

In the city, the population was spread out, with 27.8% under the age of 18, 6.3% from 18 to 24, 25.0% from 25 to 44, 27.8% from 45 to 64, and 13.2% who were 65 years of age or older. The median age was 38 years. For every 100 females, there were 98.6 males. For every 100 females age 18 and over, there were 94.4 males.

The median income for a household in the city was $36,250, and the median income for a family was $40,568. Males had a median income of $26,875 versus $15,000 for females. The per capita income for the city was $14,446. About 3.4% of families and 6.0% of the population were below the poverty line, including 2.5% of those under the age of eighteen and 5.7% of those 65 or over.

Education
The Denison Community School District operates public schools in the area.

References

Cities in Iowa
Cities in Crawford County, Iowa